Joshua Dobbie McKissic (born August 15, 1993) is an American football running back. He played college football at Arkansas State, where set the Sun Belt Conference record for most career receptions with 289. McKissic signed with the Atlanta Falcons as an undrafted free agent in 2016 and has also played for the Seattle Seahawks, Detroit Lions, and Washington Football Team / Commanders.

Early years and college
McKissic was born on August 15, 1993, in Phenix City, Alabama, and later played high school football at Central High School. A three-star wide receiver recruit, McKissic committed to play college football at Arkansas State over offers from Appalachian State and Coastal Carolina. He was a multi-positional player for the Arkansas State Red Wolves, starting in all but three games of his college career. As a red-shirt freshman in 2012, he had 103 receptions (2nd in the Sun Belt, and a school record), 1,022 yards receiving (3rd in the Sun Belt, 2nd all-time at Arkansas State), won Sun Belt Freshman of the Year honors, and was a Scripps Freshman All-American. In the Go-Daddy Bowl, he won the offensive MVP after tying a school record with 11 receptions, along with 113 yards and a touchdown against Kent State. His four 100+ yard receiving games tied for third most in an Arkansas State season, and he twice tied for third most receptions in a game with 12.

Over the next three years, his receiving output was less (500–700 yards), but he was used more often as a running back and return specialist. In 2013 as a sophomore, he had a school-record 15 receptions in a game 5 loss to Missouri, and a 98-yard kickoff return for a touchdown the next week against Idaho. He also threw a touchdown the last game of the season against Western Kentucky. His 82 receptions was third all-time. He received an All-American Honorable Mention in 'Sports Illustrated', and was on the Biletnikoff Award watchlist. He was named a Sun Belt All-Conference player at three positions (All-purpose, wide receiver, and return specialist). In the Go-Daddy Bowl, he had nine receptions for 72 yards against Ball State. In 2014, the Junior again helped his team return to the GoDaddy Bowl, and again won the MVP. Overall, he finished the 2014 season with 52 receptions for 629 receiving yards and nine rushes for 115 yards and a rushing touchdown.

His senior year, he was named a Sun Belt All-Conference player for the third time, as both a wide receiver and all-purpose player, after recording 525 yards receiving, 112 yards rushing, and 654 kickoff return yards (5th all time, including a school record with 211 in game 7 against Toledo, and his second touchdown). He was injured early in the New Orleans Bowl, but still recorded three receptions for 26 yards, three rushes for 25 yards, a 9-yard completed pass, and an 18-yard kickoff return against Louisiana Tech.

He was named to the all-Arkansas State team in 2017. He ended his career with 289 receptions (a Sun Belt Conference record), for 2,838 yards (a school record) and 11 touchdowns, returned 53 kickoffs for 1,473 yards with an average return of 27.8 yards.

Professional career

Atlanta Falcons
McKissic signed with the Atlanta Falcons after going undrafted in the 2016 NFL Draft. His first touch in the NFL was a 101-yard kickoff return for a touchdown in a preseason game against the Washington Redskins.
On September 3, 2016, McKissic was waived by the Falcons as part of final roster cuts and was signed to the practice squad the next day. He was promoted to the active roster on December 16, 2016, but he was waived three days later.

Seattle Seahawks
McKissic was claimed off waivers by the Seattle Seahawks on December 20, 2016. In Week 17, against the 49ers, he made his NFL debut and had two receptions for 16 yards.

In Week 4 of the 2017 season against Indianapolis, he had four carries for 38 yards (including a 30-yard touchdown on his second career carry in the third quarter), and a 27-yard touchdown reception late in the fourth. Overall, he finished the 2017 season with 187 rushing yards, one rushing touchdown, 34 receptions, 266 receiving yards, and two receiving touchdowns.

On September 3, 2018, McKissic was placed on injured reserve with a foot injury. He was activated off injured reserve on November 28, 2018. On August 31, 2019, McKissic was waived as a part of final roster cuts.

Detroit Lions
On September 13, McKissic was claimed off waivers by the Detroit Lions. In the 2019 season, McKissic appeared in all 16 games, of which he started three, and recorded 38 carries for 205 rushing yards to go along with 34 receptions for 233 receiving yards and one receiving touchdown.

Washington Football Team / Commanders

On March 26, 2020, McKissic signed a two-year contract with the Washington Football Team, then known as the Redskins prior to a name change later that offseason. In Week 15 against his former team, the Seattle Seahawks, McKissic recorded 107 yards from scrimmage and a receiving touchdown during the 20–15 loss.

In Week 4 of the 2021 season, McKissic scored the game-winning touchdown on a 30-yard catch and run in a 34-30 victory over the Atlanta Falcons. In a Week 12 win against the Seattle Seahawks, McKissic scored two touchdowns, one receiving and one rushing, before suffering a concussion. He was later placed on injured reserve.

On March 15, 2022, McKissic originally agreed to terms with the Buffalo Bills on a two-year, $7 million contract before signing the same offer from Washington the following day. After being inactive with a neck injury for Weeks 9 and 10, McKissic was placed on injured reserve on November 19, 2022. He was released on March 15, 2023.

References

External links
Arkansas State Red Wolves bio

Living people
1993 births
People from Phenix City, Alabama
Players of American football from Alabama
American football wide receivers
American football running backs
Arkansas State Red Wolves football players
Atlanta Falcons players
Seattle Seahawks players
Detroit Lions players
Washington Football Team players
Washington Commanders players